Dynod son of Pabo ( or Dunod ap Pabo; ; died c. 595), better known as Dynod the Stout or Dynod Fawr was the ruler of a small kingdom in the North Pennines in the post-Roman Hen Ogledd ("Old North"). Regio Dunutinga was a minor kingdom or region in North Yorkshire mentioned in the Life of Wilfrid. P.N. Wood identifies this with the area of Craven.

Dynod was a son of Pabo Post Prydain and is thought to have succeeded to his kingdom. He was the father of Saint Deiniol, founder of Bangor by Dwywai ferch  Lleenog.

Dynod is mentioned in the Welsh Triads (TYP no.5) as one of the ‘Three Pillars of Battle’ of Ynys Prydain.
He is also mentioned in a poem on the death of Urien of Rheged. Llywarch Hen says: "Let savage Unhwch guide me; It was said in Drws Llech, ‘Dunod ap Pabo does not retreat.’" After the assassination of Urien, Dynod is said to have invaded his kingdom of Rheged, doing battle against Urien's sons Owain and Pascent. He is said to have died at the hands of the Bernician Angles around AD 595.

Dynod is often confused with the abbot  Saint Dunod of Bangor Iscoed mentioned by Bede. Archaeologist Craig Cessford suggests that Dynod may be the same individual as the baby Dinogad referred to in the early medieval Welsh lullaby Dinogad's Smock.

References

External links
 "St. Dunaut Bwr" at Britannia

Northern Brythonic monarchs
Craven District
History of North Yorkshire
6th-century Welsh monarchs
6th-century rulers in Europe
6th-century Welsh people